IOCC may refer to:

 Interception of Communications Commissioner
 International Orthodox Christian Charities
 Iron Ore Company of Canada